The 8th Parliament of Antigua and Barbuda was elected on Tuesday, 17 April 1984, and was dissolved on Monday, 20 February 1989.

It had its first meeting on Thursday, 31 May 1984.

It was the first parliament elected during Antigua and Barbuda's independence.

Acts of Parliament

Members

Senate 
Unknown

House of Representatives 
Speaker: Hon. Casford L. Murray

References 

Parliaments of Antigua and Barbuda